Grantha is a Unicode block containing the ancient Grantha script characters of 6th to 19th century Tamil Nadu and Kerala for writing Sanskrit and Manipravalam.

History
The following Unicode-related documents record the purpose and process of defining specific characters in the Grantha block:

References 

Unicode blocks